Mfundo Shumana (born 17 December 1985, in Cape Town) is a South African association football midfielder who played in the Premier Soccer League.

Personal
He hails from Nyanga on the Cape Flats.

References

1985 births
Living people
Sportspeople from Cape Town
South African soccer players
Association football midfielders
Cape Town Spurs F.C. players
Moroka Swallows F.C. players
Chippa United F.C. players
South African Premier Division players
National First Division players